The Temple of Heracles or Temple of Hercules (The Roman name of the hero) is an ancient Greek temple in the ancient city of Akragas, located in the Valle dei Templi in Agrigento.

The building, in the archaic Doric style, is found on the hill of the temples, on a rocky spur near the Villa Aurea. The name Temple of Heracles is an attribution of modern scholarship, based on Cicero's mention of a temple dedicated to the hero non longe a foro "not far from the agora" (Verrine II 4.94), containing a famous statue of Heracles. That the agora of Akragas was in this area has not yet been demonstrated, but the identification is generally accepted.

It's located approximately one kilometer away to the west from Temple of Concordia.

History
The traditionally accepted chronology of the temple identifies it as the most ancient of the Akragantine temples, dating to the final years of the 6th century BC. This dating is based on stylistic characteristics, especially its proportions, number of columns, and the profile of the columns and of their capitals. However, some connect the temple with the activities of Theron (Tyrant of Akragas 488-473/2 BC), claiming that it contains innovations compared to the architectural practice of the 6th century. In that case, it could be identified with the temple of Athena recorded by Polyaenus (Stratagems 6.51) in relation to the building activities of Theron in connection with his seizure of power.

The remains of the entablature constitute a problem for dating, because there are two types of Cymatium with gutters and lion heads: the first, less well-preserved than the other, datable to the 460s BC and the second datable to around the middle of the fifth century. Probably the first cymatium is the original and was replaced by the second a few decades later (for reasons unknown), and therefore the temple's foundation is to be dated to the years before the Battle of Himera (480 BC); its completion would have taken a decade or maybe a little more.

The building was restored in the Roman period with some modifications, particularly the division of the naos into three, which could indicate a dedication to multiple divinities. If still in use by the 4th-and 5th century, it would have been closed during the persecution of pagans in the late Roman Empire.

In the 20th century, the intervention of the restorers has been able to reconstruct nine of the columns on the southeastern side through anastylosis as well as part of the entablature and some of the capitals.

Architecture

The building, sitting on a crepidoma of three steps, itself on top of a substructure on the northern and western sides (due to the roughness of the terrain).  It is a peripteros temple of unusually elongated proportions (67 metres long and 25.34 meters wide), with six columns along the front (Hexastyle) and fifteen columns on the sides. Inside the peristasis is a long naos, bounded by a pronaos at the front and an opisthodomos at the back, both in antis, the remains of which seem to indicate that the destruction of the building was caused by an earthquake.

In the building's remains the presence of internal stairs for the inspection of the roof can be seen in the walls between the pronaos and the naos, which became a typical feature of Akragantine temples. The tall columns are topped by wide capitals, with a deep gulf between the stem and the echinus, which might indicate the comparative antiquity of the building (predating the other peripteros temples at Akragas by at least thirty years), along with the elongation of the naos and the wide separation of the columns from the naos. On the eastern side of the temple are the remains of the large altar of the temple.

See also
 List of Ancient Greek temples

References

External links 
Valle dei Templi Archaeological Park

6th-century BC religious buildings and structures
Heracles
Buildings and structures in the Province of Agrigento
Temples of Heracles
Valle dei Templi
6th-century BC establishments in Italy
Archaeological sites in Sicily